The 1997 NCAA men's volleyball tournament was the 28th annual tournament to determine the national champion of NCAA men's collegiate volleyball. The single-elimination tournament was played at St. John Arena in Columbus, Ohio, during May 1997.

Stanford defeated UCLA in the final match, 3–2 (15–7, 15–10, 9–15, 6–15, 14–13), to win their first national title. The Cardinal (27–4) were coached by Ruben Nieves.

Stanford's Mike Lambert was named the tournament's Most Outstanding Player. Lambert, along with five other players, comprised the All-Tournament Team.

Qualification
Until the creation of the NCAA Men's Division III Volleyball Championship in 2012, there was only a single national championship for men's volleyball. As such, all NCAA men's volleyball programs, whether from Division I, Division II, or Division III, were eligible. A total of 4 teams were invited to contest this championship.

Tournament bracket 
Site: St. John Arena, Columbus, Ohio

All tournament team 
Mike Lambert, Stanford (Most outstanding player)
Matt Fuerbringer, Stanford
Keenan Whitehurst, Stanford
Paul Nihipali, UCLA
Adam Naeve, UCLA
 Ivan Contreras, Penn State

See also 
 NCAA Men's National Collegiate Volleyball Championship
 NCAA Women's Volleyball Championships (Division I, Division II, Division III)

References

1997
NCAA Men's Volleyball Championship
NCAA Men's Volleyball Championship
1997 in sports in Ohio
Volleyball in Ohio